is a passenger railway station located in the city of Ōme, Tokyo, Japan, operated by the East Japan Railway Company (JR East).

Lines
Kabe Station is served by the Ōme Line, located 15.9 kilometers from the terminus of the line at Tachikawa Station.

Station layout
The station has one island platform serving two tracks, with an elevated station building located above the platform. The station is staffed.

Platforms

History
The station opened on 20 February 1927. It was nationalized in 1944. It became part of the East Japan Railway Company (JR East) with the breakup of the Japanese National Railways in 1987.

Passenger statistics
In fiscal 2019, the station was used by an average of 13,417 passengers daily (boarding passengers only).

Surrounding area
 Meisei University
Shiofune Kannon

See also
 List of railway stations in Japan

References

External links 

 Kabe Station information (JR East) 

Railway stations in Tokyo
Ōme Line
Stations of East Japan Railway Company
Railway stations in Japan opened in 1927
Ōme, Tokyo